A.F. Mozhaysky's Military-Space Academy is a Military Academy of the Armed Forces of the Russian Federation. It is located in Saint Petersburg. It is associated with the Russian Aerospace Defence Forces.

History 
The Academy was established on 16 January 1712 in Moscow as a military engineering school. During the first years the facilities in the Academy were in bad position. During the reign of Catherine the Great the school was renamed to Artillery and Engineering Gentry Corps. In 1773, it acquired its own printing house. Two years later the Museum of History of housing, Library for Foreign Literature was created. In 1880, the school got the name Second Cadet Corps. Since 1955 the academy has been named after the famous Russian engineer and mechanic Alexander Mozhaysky. The Academy has been used to train GRU officers, including some of the Fancy Bear hackers.

Sport 
Hockey team

Structure 

Faculty of design of aircraft
Faculty of rocket and space systems management
Department of radio-electronic systems of space systems
Faculty of space infrastructure
Faculty of collecting and processing information.
Faculty of information security and computer technology
Faculty survey support and cartography
Faculty funds missile and space defense
Department of automated command and control systems

Leadership 
 Lieutenant General Prof. Maxim Mikhailovich Penkov

References

External links 
 
 

Military academies of Russia
1712 establishments in Russia
Educational institutions established in 1712
Universities and colleges in Saint Petersburg